Nuaveh (also Romanized as Nūāveh; also known as Nūā Deh) is a village in Melkari Rural District, Vazineh District, Sardasht County, West Azerbaijan Province, Iran. At the 2006 census, its population was 492, in 68 families.

References 

Populated places in Sardasht County